Anna Karenina is a four-part British television adaptation of Leo Tolstoy's 1877 novel of the same name.

It was directed by David Blair and aired in the United Kingdom on Channel 4 from 9 to 30 May 2000 and in America on PBS Masterpiece Theatre in 2001.

Plot
Anna is travelling by train from St. Petersburg to Moscow to visit her brother, Stiva. Stiva is married to Dolly; however, he has been having an affair with the governess of his children and needs Anna's help to repair his marriage.

Anna too is married, to Karenin, an important official, with an 8-year-old son. At the end of the journey she meets Count Vronsky, the son of her travelling companion on the train, and in due course she and Vronsky begin an affair.

In the meantime, Stiva's friend Constantine Levin courts Dolly's younger sister Kitty. Levin and Kitty are both unmarried. But Kitty is initially attracted to Vronksy and rejects Levin's first proposal; he leaves Moscow and returns to his farm in the countryside.

Nikolai, Constantine Levin's brother, cohabits with a former prostitute named Masha and is constantly in debt.

Cast
Helen McCrory as Anna
Kevin McKidd as Vronsky
Stephen Dillane as Karenin
Mark Strong as Stiva
Amanda Root as Dolly
Douglas Henshall as Levin (Constantine "Kostya")
Paloma Baeza as Kitty
Abigail Cruttenden as Betsy
Paul Rhys as Nikolai
Gillian Barge as Princess Shcherbatskya
Malcolm Sinclair as Prince Shcherbatsky
Victoria Carling as Annushka

Reception
It received a positive review from Mark Law in The Guardian.

External links

Masterpiece official page

References

2000 British television series debuts
2000 British television series endings
2000s British drama television series
Channel 4 television dramas
Adaptations of works by Leo Tolstoy
Television series set in the 19th century
Television shows based on Russian novels
2000s British television miniseries
Television series by All3Media
English-language television shows
Television shows set in Russia
Television series set in the 1870s